Heinz Kuttin (born 5 January 1971) is an Austrian former ski jumper.

Career
At the 1992 Winter Olympics in Albertville, he won a silver medal in the Team large hill and a bronze Medal in the Individual large hill. At the 1994 Winter Olympics in Lillehammer, he won a bronze medal in the Team large hill.

Kuttin's biggest successes were at the FIS Nordic World Ski Championships where he earned four medals, including two golds (Individual normal hill and Team large hill: 1991) and two bronzes (Team large hill: 1993; Individual normal hill: 1989). He worked as an assistant coach of the Austrian national team in 2002–2003, coached the Polish B team in 2003 and then the Polish national team from 2004 to 2006.

Since as of 2014 he is the official head coach of the national Austrian ski jumping team after the retirement of the prior coach Alexander Pointner.

World Cup

Standings

Wins

External links
 
 

Austrian male ski jumpers
Olympic ski jumpers of Austria
Ski jumpers at the 1988 Winter Olympics
Ski jumpers at the 1992 Winter Olympics
Ski jumpers at the 1994 Winter Olympics
Austrian ski jumping coaches
1971 births
Living people
Olympic medalists in ski jumping
FIS Nordic World Ski Championships medalists in ski jumping
Medalists at the 1992 Winter Olympics
Medalists at the 1994 Winter Olympics
Olympic silver medalists for Austria
Olympic bronze medalists for Austria
People from Villach-Land
Sportspeople from Carinthia (state)
20th-century Austrian people